The Maroochy air crash was an aircraft accident that occurred at 11.10am on 30 December 1950 at Maroochydore beach, Queensland, Australia. Three children were killed and fourteen others were seriously injured as a result of the accident.

CAC Wirraway Serial Number A20-212 of the Royal Australian Air Force had been circling between Maroochydore and Alexandra Headland during a routine shark patrol when it suddenly banked steeply and crashed onto the crowded beach in front of the Maroochydore Surf Life Saving Club. The pilot and his observer survived the impact of the crash.

Memorials
On 9 March 2013, a 2.4-metre 'Maroochy Air Crash Memorial' was erected at the site in memory of those killed and injured.

References

External links
Memorial details
Sunshine Coast set to have memorial to RAAF aircraft Wirraway after plane crash 60 years ago
Shirley remembers day she lost young brother (Graham Blair)
Headstone for Pauline Probert, located in old Nambour Cemetery
Photo of Liam O'Connor on a camping holiday at Maroochydore, December 1950
Map of location of air crash
Marked image of aircraft flight path to beach from The Sunday Mail on 31 December 1950

Aviation accidents and incidents in 1950
1950 in Australia
History of Queensland
Aviation accidents and incidents in Queensland
Accidents and incidents involving military aircraft
1950s in Queensland
December 1950 events in Australia
1950 disasters in Australia